The Straining Tower at Lake Vyrnwy is an intake tower built to extract water from the lake. The tower stands on the north shore of Lake Vyrnwy, near the village of Llanwddyn, in Powys, Wales. The Lake Vyrnwy dam project was designed to provide a water supply to the city of Liverpool and work on the dam began in 1881. On its completion 11 years later, the lake was the largest reservoir in Europe and water was drawn from it into the straining tower and carried to Liverpool on a 110km-long aqueduct. The engineers for the project were Thomas Hawksley and George Frederick Deacon, although the straining tower was entirely Deacon's design. The tower is constructed in a Gothic Revival style, purportedly based on the tower of the castle at Chillon, Switzerland. It draws heavily on the contemporaneous work of William Burges, whose Cardiff Castle and Castell Coch are clear influences. The straining tower is a Grade I listed building.

History
The Lake Vyrnwy dam project was part of a national endeavour to supply water for drinking and sanitation to the expanding Victorian cities of the Industrial Revolution. Construction of the dam, which involved the relocation of the village of Llanwddyn, began in 1881, the lake was filled by 1888, and the first supplies of water to Liverpool, 68 miles away, began in July 1892. Forty-four workmen died during construction, 10 from workplace accidents, and are commemorated in a memorial at the lake. Another commemorative stone celebrates the official commencement of the reservoir's construction on 14 July 1881 by Edward Herbert, 3rd Earl of Powis. On its completion, the lake was the largest reservoir in Europe, and the aqueduct to Liverpool the longest in the world.

Water is extracted from the lake through the straining tower. Designed by George Frederick Deacon and completed in 1892, the tower extracts water from the lake by hydraulic pressure. It contains three filtration strainers which were used to cleanse the lake water before onward transportation. They have now been superseded by modern purification facilities located away from the lake.

Architecture
The tower stands 52m high, and is constructed of concrete faced with snecked rubble. The style Deacon deployed is Gothic Revival and Robert Scourfield and Richard Haslam, in their 2013 volume, Powys, of the Buildings of Wales series, note that he was "clearly influenced by Burges". The circular tower is topped by an octagonal turret with a range of pyramidal roofs of copper. The straining tower is a Grade I listed building. The Cadw listing records the traditional suggestion that Deacon was influenced by Chillon Castle in his choice of style, but supports Pevsner in suggesting that contemporary, and relatively local, examples by William Burges were the more likely sources.

Notes

References

Sources
 

Buildings and structures in Powys
Grade I listed buildings in Powys
Gothic Revival architecture in Wales